Signal-to-quantization-noise ratio (SQNR or SNqR) is widely used quality measure in analysing digitizing schemes such as pulse-code modulation (PCM). The SQNR reflects the relationship between the maximum nominal signal strength and the quantization error (also known as quantization noise) introduced in the analog-to-digital conversion.

The SQNR formula is derived from the general signal-to-noise ratio (SNR) formula:

where:

 is the probability of received bit error
 is the peak message signal level
 is the mean message signal level

As SQNR applies to quantized signals, the formulae for SQNR refer to discrete-time digital signals. For  quantization steps, each sample,  requires  bits.

As SQNR, like SNR, is a ratio of signal power to some noise power, it can be calculated as:

The signal power is:
 
The quantization noise power can be expressed as:

Giving:

When the SQNR is desired in terms of decibels (dB), a useful approximation to SQNR is:

Note that for each bit added to a sample, the SQNR goes up by approximately 6dB.

References 
 B. P. Lathi , Modern Digital and Analog Communication Systems (3rd edition), Oxford University Press, 1998

External links
  Signal to quantization noise in quantized sinusoidal - Analysis of quantization error on a sine wave

Digital audio
Engineering ratios
Noise (electronics)